The Sultan Ali Raja or Ali Raja or Adi Raja was the title of the Muslim king of Arakkal kingdom from the sixteenth to early nineteenth century.

Arakkal dynasty

Reigning rajas and beebis
 Ali Raja Ali I (1545–1591)
 Ali Raja Abubakar I (1591–1607)
 Ali Raja Abubakar II (1607–1610)
 Ali Raja Muhammad Ali I (1610–1647)
 Ali Raja Muhammad Ali II (1647–1655)
 Ali Raja Kamal (1655–1656)
 Ali Raja Muhammad Ali III (1656–1691)
 Ali Raja Ali II (1691–1704)
 Ali Raja Kunhi Amsa I (1704–1720)
 Ali Raja Muhammad Ali IV (1720–1728)
 Ali Raja Beevi Harrabichi Kadavube Sultana (1728–1732)
 Ali Raja Beevi Junumabe Sultana I (1732–1745)
 Ali Raja Kunhi Amsa II (1745–1777)
 Ali Raja Beevi Junumabe Sultana II (1777–1819)

Heads of the Arakkal dynasty since 1819
 Arakkal Beevi Mariambe Sultana (1819–1838)
 Arakkal Beevi Hayashabe Sultana (1838–1852)
 Sultan Abdul Rahman I Ali Raja (1852–1870)
 Sultan Musa Ali Raja (1870–1899)
 Sultan Muhammad Ali Raja V (1899–1907)
 Arakkal Beevi Imbichi Sultana(1907–1911)
 Sultan Ahmad Ali Raja (1911–1921)
 Arakkal Beevi Ayesha Sultana I (1921–1931)
 Sultan Abdul Rahman Ali Raja (1931–1946)
 Arakkal Beevi Mariumma Sultana (1946–1947)
 Sultan Hamza Ali Raja (1981–1998)
 Arakkal Beevi Muthu Sultana (1998–2006)
 Arakkal Beevi Zainaba Ayesha Sultana II (2006–2018)
 Arakkal Beevi Muthu Sultana II (2018-2019) 
 Arakkal Beevi Mariumma Sultana II (2019-2021) 
 Sultan Hameed Hussain Koyamma Ali Raja (2021-present) .

See also
 Arakkal Museum
 Keyi family
 Kannur Fort - (St. Angelo Fort)
 List of Sunni Muslim dynasties
 Mysore invasion of Kerala

References

People from Kannur
Indian Muslims
Mysorean invasion of Malabar